Asea may refer to:

 ASEA (American company), a direct selling and marketing company
 African Securities Exchanges Association or African Stock Exchanges Association, an alliance of African exchanges
 ASEA, a former Swedish industrial company, now part of ABB
 Asea, Greece, a village in Arcadia, Greece
 Asea (Arcadia), a town of ancient Arcadia, Greece

See also
 Asia (disambiguation)